Parvocellular cells, also called P-cells, are neurons located within the parvocellular layers of the lateral geniculate nucleus (LGN) of the thalamus.  "Parvus" is Latin for "small", and the name "parvocellular" refers to the small size of the cell compared to the larger magnocellular cells.  Phylogenetically, parvocellular neurons are more modern than magnocellular ones.

Function

The parvocellular neurons of the visual system receive their input from midget cells, a type of retinal ganglion cell, whose axons are excite the optic tract.  These synapses occur in one of the four dorsal parvocellular layers of the lateral geniculate nucleus.  The information from each eye is kept separate at this point, and continues to be segregated until processing in the visual cortex.  The electrically-encoded visual information leaves the parvocellular cells via relay cells in the optic radiations, traveling to the primary visual cortex layer 4C-β.  The parvocellular neurons are sensitive to colour, and are more capable of discriminating fine details than their magnocellular counterparts. Parvocellular cells have greater spatial resolution, but lower temporal resolution, than the magnocellular cells.

See also 

Koniocellular cell
Magnocellular cell

List of human cell types derived from the germ layers

References

External links
 NIF Search - Parvocellular Cell via the Neuroscience Information Framework

Visual system
Thalamus